Strandoceras is a strongly curved cyrtogomphoceratid with a laterally compressed cross section from the middle and upper Ordovician of Northern Europe; Estonia, Norway, the U.K.

The body chamber of Stradoceras is straighter and more slender than the chambered phragmocone; the venter narrowly rounded with a shallow hyponomic sinus; the aperture open, sutures with shallow lateral lobes.  The siphuncle is close to the venter which is on the inside, endogastric curvature. Segments are large and broadly rounded; connecting rings thick, bullettes large.

Strandoceras gave rise to the Phragmoceratidae and  very likely to Kiaeroceras and Cyrtogomphoceras, which in turn gave rise to Landeroceras, within the Cyrtogomphoceratidae

References
 Flower, R H and Teichert, C; 1957. The Cephalopod Order Discosorida. University of Kansas Paleontological Contributions. Mollusca, Article 6, pp 1–144.
 Teicher, C. 1964. Nautiloidea-Discosorida. Treatise on Invertebrate Paleontology, Part K. Teichert and Moore, eds.

Discosorida
Prehistoric nautiloid genera
Middle Ordovician first appearances
Late Ordovician extinctions